The Moriolaceae are a family of fungi with an uncertain taxonomic placement in the class Dothideomycetes. A monotypic taxon, it contains the single genus Moriola.

References

External links
Index Fungorum

Dothideomycetes enigmatic taxa
Monogeneric fungus families